Ahiman is the name of two persons in the Bible:

 One of the three giant sons of Anak (the other two being Sheshai and Talmai) whom Caleb and the Israelite spies saw in Mount Hebron (Book of Numbers 13:22) when they went in to explore the promised land. They were afterwards driven out and slain (Joshua 15:14; Judges 1:10).
A Levite who was one of the guardians of the temple after the Exile (1 Chronicles 9:17).

The name means "brother of the right hand" / "brother of a gift", "liberal."

References
Beecher, Willis J. "Ahiman" in the International Standard Bible Encyclopedia.

Set index articles on Hebrew Bible people
Rephaites
Levites
Anakim

he:ענק#הענקים במקרא